The Frames are an Irish rock band based in Dublin. Founded in 1990 by Glen Hansard, the band has been influential in the Dublin rock music scene. The group has released six studio albums. In addition to Hansard, the band's current line-up includes original member Colm Mac Con Iomaire, Dave Hingerty, Joe Doyle, and Rob Bochnik.

History

The band was established in 1990 and consists of survivors of Dublin's prolific early 1990s rock-and-roll scene. Through support slots, the band was central to the development of many emerging Irish rock bands of the time, including Turn and Bell X1, and a host of singer-songwriters such as Mundy, Paddy Casey, David Kitt and Damien Dempsey. In December 2004, Hansard appeared on stage to collaborate with Paddy Casey and The Dublin Gospel Choir. In 2007 The Frames toured Australia and New Zealand as the support act for Bob Dylan.

The name The Frames arose from Hansard's habit of fixing bicycles of his friends. The large number of bicycle frames lying around his house led neighbours to dub it the "house with the frames". In a 2001 interview, Hansard said, "I worked in a bicycle shop for a little while, but the name came from ... my back garden was so full of frames, my house became known as The Frames house, much to my mother's distaste, she hated it. But my garden was full of frames, old bikes, I would make up bikes for my friends out of all the old bikes. So it sort of became known if anybody found a bike up on the hill on the way home they would throw it into my garden, a graveyard for old bikes."

The band has had many members over the years, some of whom have also been, or later became, members of other Dublin rock bands. Colm Mac Con Iomaire and Dave Odlum both were founding members of folk group Kíla. Graham Downey, son of Thin Lizzy drummer Brian Downey, played bass for the band between 1993 and 1996.

The Frames have always collaborated closely with other groups that emerged from the buskers on Grafton Street, Dublin, where Hansard started his music career. Among these groups were the aforementioned Kíla, and Mic Christopher. When Christopher died in 2001, Hansard and his band were heavily involved in organising the Skylarkin' concert to commemorate his life and release the album. The Frames still occasionally perform Mic's songs—chiefly "Heyday"—as a tribute.

The band is also known for interspersing snippets of songs by other artists into their own as a form of homage; notable examples are "Redemption Song" by Bob Marley, "Ring of Fire" by Johnny Cash, "Lilac Wine" by James Shelton (as made popular by Jeff Buckley / Elkie Brooks) and "Pure Imagination" from Willy Wonka & the Chocolate Factory.

In 1991, Hansard came to public attention after taking the part of "Outspan" Foster in the film The Commitments. However, Hansard regretted this role as he felt it distracted from his music career. Mac Con Iomaire also had a cameo in the movie as a violinist auditioning for the band. Bronagh Gallagher, one of Hansard's colleagues, can be seen wearing a Frames T-shirt in her appearance in the film Pulp Fiction. Hansard appeared on screen as the principal character parodied by Irish music comedy Web site Eyebrowy.com and in 2007 as the lead in the movie Once which featured his songs.

As of 2007, the band consisted of Glen Hansard, Joe Doyle, Colm Mac Con Iomaire, Rob Bochnik and Johnny Boyle. Various people played drums during 2003 and 2004, including Graham Hopkins who drummed Dance the Devil, Burn the Maps, and the band's latest album The Cost. On one version of the album Fitzcarraldo, the band used the name The Frames DC, to avoid confusion with an American band.

The band released its sixth studio album, The Cost, on 22 September 2006. They appeared on the setlist at Lollapalooza 2006 just 12 days afterward.

The band's song "Dream Awake" was used in the pilot episode of NBC's Life. Also, "Finally" was prominently featured in the 11th episode of the show, when the title character reaped the rewards of the detective work which he had been doing all season. However, a different song is used in the version of the episode on nbc.com. The band's song "Seven Day Mile" was used in the season six premiere of House on Fox.

The band's ex-bassist, John Carney, is now a film director, best known for writing and directing the film Once, which stars Hansard, who wrote much of the music for the film. Hansard and Marketa Irglova won an Academy Award for Best Original Song for "Falling Slowly" from Once.

On 13 May 2008 the US iTunes store released a Deluxe Edition of The Cost. This edition included three extra songs—"The Blood", "No More I Love Yous", and "This Low". It also included the music videos for "Falling Slowly", "Sad Songs", and "The Side You Never Get to See".

In late 2009 the band appeared on The Swell Season's album, Strict Joy. On 24 March 2010 the band announced their first concert in three years at Electric Picnic to celebrate their 20th anniversary.

The Song "Rise" from the Album The Cost was featured at the end of season 3, episode 13 of the ABC series "Castle".

On 1 December 2012 the band announced that the documentary In The Deep Shade would be released in 2013. The film, which captured their 2010 20th Anniversary Tour, was shot by Conor Masterson.

Since shooting to stardom in the wake of 'Once' and his Oscar win, Hansard has played primarily solo concerts (often with several members of the Frames) in recent years. The Frames have continued to play a handful of gigs; in June 2014 they played Whelan's in honor of its 25th anniversary, surprising the audience by buying all of their drinks. The venue's owners had lent money to the band in the 1990s to enable them to record Fitzcarraldo.

In 2015, the band played a pair of shows at Iveagh Gardens in Dublin. On 4–5 July they treated an enthusiastic and loyal fan base to such rarities as 15 Seafort Parade. On 11 July they played the Marquee Festival in Cork.

In April 2020, the band were forced to postpone a sold-out show marking their 30th anniversary in Kilmainham, Dublin on 20 June 2020 due to the COVID-19 restrictions in force in Ireland. However they later surprised fans by playing a live set on Instagram from a secluded location in Ireland on the same date. The band subsequently rescheduled their three September 2020 shows in the US for dates in 2021 which were then cancelled due to complications with international travel restrictions and visas making it impossible for the band to enter the country to perform.

The Frames 30th Anniversary show finally went ahead in the grounds of the Royal Hospital Kilmainham, Dublin on the evening of 28 May 2022 to an audience of approximately 10,000 fans. Opening acts Cormac Begley and Wallis Bird entertained the audience before the headliners took to the stage at 8pm to deliver a 25-song setlist to the enthusiastic crowd on what was described as a 'perfect summer's evening'.

Members
Glen Hansard: vocals, guitar (1990–present)
Colm Mac Con Iomaire: keyboards, vocals, violin (1990–present)
Joe Doyle: bass guitar, vocals (1996–present)
Rob Bochnik: guitar, vocals (2002–present)
Johnny Boyle (2003–2008, 2021–present) (drums)
Ruth O'Mahony Brady: keyboard (2020–present)

Former
 Noreen O'Donnell: (1990–1996) (vocals)
 Dave Odlum: (1990–2002) (guitar; Odlum later co-produced album Burn the Maps with Bochnik)
 Paul Brennan (Binzer): (1990–1998) (drums, percussion)
 John Carney: (1990–1993) (bass guitar, vocals)
 Graham Downey: (1993–1996) (bass guitar)
 Johnny Boyle (2003–2008) (drums)
 Graham Hopkins (2008–2019) (drums)
 Dave Hingerty: (1998-2003, 2019–2020) (drums, percussion)

Timeline

Discography

Albums

Live albums

Singles and EPs
 "The Dancer" (1991)
 "Masquerade" (1992)
 Turn on Your Record Player EP (1992)
 Picture of Love (1993)
 Angel at My Table (1994)
 "Revelate" (1995)
 "Monument" (1996)
 I am the Magic Hand (15 February 1999)
 Pavement Tune (1999)
 Rent Day Blues EP (1999)
 Come on Up to the House (1999—Compilation featuring "Star Star" by The Frames)
 Lay Me Down (2001)
 Headlong (2002)
 The Roads Outgrown EP (2003)
 "Fake" (12 September 2003)
 "Finally" (20 August 2004)
 "Sideways Down" (28 January 2005)
 "Happy" (Radio Single Only – 2005)
 "Falling Slowly/No More I Love Yous" (1 September 2006)

See also
The Stars Are Underground
The Swell Season

References

External links 

The Frames at Anti-
 Order In The Sound (a fan site & archive for The Frames, Glen Hansard & other related projects)
The Frames at Little Big Music
The Frames collection at the Internet Archive's live music archive
Glen performs at The Current
Ian Peel: Warriors of pop, 21 years of ZTT Record Collector, September 2004 (copy at Zang Tuum Tumb and all that) Article on the history of ZTT Records, contains a paragraph about The Frames
 The Frames live in Sydney 2007

Irish alternative rock groups
Musical groups from Dublin (city)
Musical groups established in 1990
Musical quintets
ZTT Records artists
Irish indie pop groups
Irish folk rock groups
Anti- (record label) artists